Orthotropic  may refer to:

 Orthotropic material is one that has different material properties or strengths in different orthogonal directions (e.g., glass-reinforced plastic, or wood)
 Orthotropic deck, in bridge design, is one made from solid steel plate
 Orthotropic movement, in botany, is a type of tropism along the same axis as the stimulus
 Orthotropics, a method claimed to be able to guide facial growth